Aarti Majumdar (born March 3, 1978), better known by her stage name Aarti Mann, is an American actress. She has starred in several television programs, including a part in the sci-fi drama Heroes following the show Never Have I Ever. She is best known for playing the role of Priya Koothrappali in The Big Bang Theory.

Early life and education 
Mann, which is an abbreviation of her married name, was born in Connecticut on March 3, 1978, in a Gujarati Hindu family from Junagadh Gujarat, India, and is a first generation Indian American. Her parents are originally from Gujarat, India.

When Mann was still a toddler, she moved with her family, which consisted of her parents, her older sister Kruti and younger brother Nishad, to several places in Pennsylvania. When she was a young child she lived in Pittsburgh, Mt. Lebanon and Wexford before settling in Fox Chapel. Her mother, Vasanti Majumdar, a graduate of University of Pittsburgh Medical Center (UPMC), still lives in Fox Chapel and is a physician specializing in obstetrics and gynaecology. Mann's father, who was also a physician, died while she was in high school.

Despite Mann having never acted in plays during high school at Shady Side Academy in Point Breeze, she graduated with a degree in film writing and directing from New York University where she practiced acting.

Career 
Mann began acting in the mid-2000s, initially playing minor roles. She uses both Aarti Majumdar and Aarti Mann as her professional names.

Mann's brother Nishad is a journalist and her sister Kruti helped influence her decision to switch to acting. Kruti, who also lives in Los Angeles, is a filmmaker and cast Mann in her 2006 film The Memsahib. While filming her scenes, Mann said she "got bit by the bug" to act and enrolled in acting classes in Los Angeles.

Mann appeared in a commercial for Volvo and other roles followed, including a part in the web/TV series Quarterlife, which aired briefly on NBC in 2008. She was also a guest star on Heroes in 2009. Mann appeared in the season two winter premiere of Suits on the USA Network. Mann was originally cast in the role of Stephanie for the USA Network pilot Paging Dr. Freed, but did not appear in the final version because the network envisioned a different type for the character.

Personal life 
Mann currently lives in Los Angeles with her husband, Purvesh Mankad who works in finance, and their daughter, Nikita.

Filmography

Film

Television

References

External links 
 

1978 births
21st-century American actresses
American film actresses
Actresses from Connecticut
Actresses from Pittsburgh
American Hindus
American actresses of Indian descent
American television actresses
Living people
Tisch School of the Arts alumni
Shady Side Academy alumni